Joyce Rovincer Mpanga (née Masembe born 22 January 1934) is an Ugandan politician and member of the Lukiiko since 2009. Mpanga was the Minister of Women in Development from 1988 to 1989 and the Minister of State for Primary Education from 1989 to 1992. Outside of the cabinet of Uganda, Mpanga was a Member of Parliament from 1996 to 2001 for Mubende District.

Early life and education
Mpanga was born on 22 January 1934 in Mityana, Uganda and attended Gayaza High School. After graduating from Makerere College in 1958, she went to the University of London for a Bachelor of Arts and Indiana University  Bloomington for her Master of Science in 1962.

Career
Mpanga began her career as a teacher at Makerere College in 1958 and deputy headmistress of Gayaza High School in 1962. During her time in Makerere, Mpanga was elected onto the Uganda Legislative Council in 1960. Mpagna left for England in exile a year after the 1966 attack of Lubiri and returned to Uganda in 1972. While in England, she was an elementary school teacher.

In 1988, Mpanga became Uganda's first Minister of Women in Development and was succeeded by Gertrude Byekwaso Lubega. The following year, she was named Minister of State for Primary Education and held this position until 1991. Apart from serving in the cabinet of Uganda, Mpanga was also a Member of Parliament for the Mubende District from 1996 to 2001. In between her political positions, she took part in the rewriting of the Constitution of Uganda in 1995. In 2009, Mpanga became a member of the Lukiiko for Buwekula and is a representative of women for Buganda's parliament since 2011.

Personal life
Mpanga was married with two children. Her grandson is a rapper and spoken word artist George the Poet.

References

1934 births
Living people
Government ministers of Uganda
Members of the Parliament of Uganda
Women government ministers of Uganda
Women members of the Parliament of Uganda
Women school principals and headteachers
20th-century Ugandan women politicians
20th-century Ugandan politicians